Ferreycorp is a Peruvian conglomerate engaged in the import, distribution, sale, leasing and maintenance of construction, mining, agricultural and transport equipment, vehicles and machinery such as, tractors, trucks and excavators under the Caterpillar, Iveco, Yutong, Massey Ferguson, Terex and many others brands.

The company was founded in 1922 as "Enrique Ferreyros y Cia Sociedad en Comandita" by Enrique Ferreyros Ayulo and a small group of partners. Twenty years later the company began to represent others brands in Peru, starting with Caterpillar.

In 1981 it was transformed into the anonymous society/corporation as part of modernization and a new corporate structure in 1998 and opened the capital on the Lima Stock Exchange.

Ferreyros, was included in the investigation into the case of phantom contributions to the Fujimori political party Fuerza 2011. In December 2019, Ferreycorp's management appeared before the money laundering prosecutor's office, which is investigating the phantom contributions of Fuerza Popular.

References 

 https://web.archive.org/web/20150415201129/https://www.ferreyros.com.pe/novedades/noticias/ferreyros-cambia-de-razon-social-y-de-numero-de-ruc
 http://books.google.com.pe/books?id=DKFOmQubo28C&pg=PA260&lpg=PA260&dq=ferreyros+la+positiva&source=bl&ots=_KWheds-7a&sig=OKPDI7_5ey9Ezh-8OIuOsKC4OF0&hl=es-419&sa=X&ei=FbD3UIWxGof09gSo3IHQBg&ved=0CEMQ6AEwBA#v=onepage&q=ferreyros%20la%20positiva&f=false
 http://www.ferreycorp.com.pe/

Companies based in Lima
Ferreyros family